Thomas Fellows may refer to:

 Thomas Howard Fellows (1822–1878), English rower and an Australian politician and judge
 Thomas Fellows (author), American author

See also 
 Thomas Fellowes (disambiguation)